Joshua Kekaulahao ( – May 7, 1856) was a politician and judge in the Kingdom of Hawaii. His name is often spelled Kekaulahau.

Biography
Born around 1824, Kekaulahao was the son of A. Kaina, who was a captain of the interisland steamer Akamai. A sister of his married Jonah Kapena. Kekaulahao also had a son who died in the smallpox epidemic of 1853. A vaccination administered by a Honolulu physician failed to save the child, and he died at Lahaina after bathing in the sea to alleviate the malignant case of smallpox. The 1853 epidemic resulted in about and 2,485 reported deaths but the death toll was probably as high as five or six thousand, about eight percent of the islands' population. The Hawaiian government made smallpox vaccination compulsory in 1854.

Kekaulahao was one of the first generation of Hawaiians to receive a western education by the American missionaries who arrived in Hawaii in 1820. In 1836, he began his education at Lahainaluna Seminary and graduated in 1841. Some of his classmates included writer S. N. Haleole, historian Samuel Kamakau and future royal governor George Luther Kapeau.
After graduating from Lahainaluna, Kekaulahao became a practicing attorney in the early days of the kingdom. He entered the service of the Hawaiian government as a clerk for the House of Nobles in the 1846 session of the Hawaiian legislature. Throughout much of the early 1850s, he led an active career in the politics of the kingdom.
In 1851, he was elected as a member of the House of Representatives, the lower house of the legislature, representing the district of ʻEwa, Oʻahu. Kekaulahao would serve as a representative from 1851 to 1852. On April 14, 1853, he was elevated to the position of a member of the House of Nobles, the upper house of the legislature traditionally reserved for the chiefs, serving until 1855.
Initially serving as a secretary on the Board of Land Commissioners, he succeeded Zorobabela Kaʻauwai as one of the commissioners on the board after Kaʻauwai's resignation. The board was in charge of settling or quieting land claims of the Great Māhele. He served on the board from 1850 to 1855. On April 24, 1855, Kekaulahao was appointed Circuit Judge for Oʻahu succeeding his cousin John Kalili, who died in office.

Kekaulahao died on May 7, 1856 in Honolulu at the age of thirty-two. Two years later in 1858, he and five members of his family including his younger brother, father, son, sister, and cousin John Kalili were buried in the cemetery of the Kawaiahaʻo Church in a ceremony which included the use of Niihau mats as burial goods.

References

Bibliography
 
 
 
 
 
 
 

1820s births
1856 deaths
Native Hawaiian people
Hawaiian Kingdom politicians
Members of the Hawaiian Kingdom House of Representatives
Hawaiian Kingdom judges
Lahainaluna School alumni
Burials at Kawaiahaʻo Church